COVID-19 is a contagious disease caused by a virus.

COVID-19 may also refer to:

COVID-19 pandemic
COVID-19 pandemic by country and territory
COVID-19 lockdowns
COVID-19 vaccine
COVID-19 testing
COVID-19 misinformation
COVID-19 pandemic cases
COVID-19 deaths (disambiguation)
COVID-19 vaccine misinformation and hesitancy
COVID-19 rapid antigen test
COVID-19 apps